George Dorsett (born 1881) was an English footballer who played for West Bromwich Albion and Manchester City as a winger and wing-half.

References

1881 births
1942 deaths
English footballers
Manchester City F.C. players
West Bromwich Albion F.C. players
People from Brownhills
English Football League players
English Football League representative players
Association football wingers
Association football wing halves